The 2003 Big 12 Conference baseball tournament was once again held at AT&T Bricktown Ballpark in Oklahoma City, OK (after a one-year hiatus) from May 21 through 25.  Texas won their second consecutive tournament and earned the Big 12 Conference's automatic bid to the 2003 NCAA Division I baseball tournament. The tournament mirrored the format of the College World Series, with two 4-team double-elimination brackets and a final championship game.

Regular Season Standings
Source:

Colorado and Iowa State did not sponsor baseball teams.

Tournament

 * indicates extra-inning game.
Kansas State and Texas Tech did not make the tournament.

All-Tournament team

See also
College World Series
NCAA Division I Baseball Championship
Big 12 Conference baseball tournament

References

Big 12 Tourney media guide 
2003 Big 12 All Tourney Team
Boydsworld 2003 Standings

Tournament
Big 12 Conference Baseball Tournament
Big 12 Conference baseball tournament
Big 12 Conference baseball tournament
Baseball competitions in Oklahoma City
College sports tournaments in Oklahoma